Parliamentary elections were held in Nauru on 23 October 2004. Non-partisan followers of Ludwig Scotty won a majority, and he was elected president by the parliament (the Nauruan president is effectively a prime minister as he is also an MP, as is the case in South Africa and Botswana).

Results

References

Elections in Nauru
Nauru
2004 in Nauru
Election and referendum articles with incomplete results